Ana Catalina Ramírez Talero (born December 6, 1991) is a Colombian female rugby sevens player for the Colombian women's national rugby sevens team. She was in the squad for the 2015 Pan Am Games. She was also named in their squad for the 2016 Summer Olympics.

References

External links 
 

1991 births
Living people
Female rugby sevens players
Rugby sevens players at the 2015 Pan American Games
Rugby sevens players at the 2016 Summer Olympics
Colombia international rugby sevens players
Olympic rugby sevens players of Colombia
Central American and Caribbean Games gold medalists for Colombia
Competitors at the 2014 Central American and Caribbean Games
Central American and Caribbean Games medalists in rugby sevens
Pan American Games competitors for Colombia
Colombia international women's rugby sevens players
21st-century Colombian women